Cambarus obeyensis, the Obey crayfish, is a species of crayfish in the family Cambaridae. It is found in North America.

The IUCN conservation status of Cambarus obeyensis is "CR", critically endangered. The species faces an extremely high risk of extinction in the immediate future. The population is decreasing. The IUCN status was reviewed in 2010.

References

Further reading

 
 
 

Cambaridae
Articles created by Qbugbot
Crustaceans described in 1947
Taxa named by Horton H. Hobbs Jr.